This is a list of current and former artists who have recorded for Reprise Records or one of its associated labels.

0–9 
 40 Below Summer
 54-40
 8stops7

A
 a-ha
 Ahmad (Giant/Reprise)
 Aimee Mann
 Air Supply (Giant/Reprise)
 Akina Nakamori 
 Al Jarreau
 Alanis Morissette (Maverick/Reprise)
 Alexander Zonjic
 Allen Sherman
 Allen Toussaint
 American Bang
 American Music Club
 Ananda Shankar
 Andreas Johnson
 Arkarna
 Arlo Guthrie
 Army of Lovers (Giant/Reprise) (US/Canada)
 Art of Dying (Intoxication/Reprise)
 Ash (North America)
 Atlantic Starr

B
 Babble
 Babes in Toyland
 Baker Knight
 Barenaked Ladies
 Barney Kessel
 Bash & Pop (Sire/Reprise)
 Beatmasters (Rhythm King/Sire/Reprise)
 Belly (Sire/Reprise)
 Ben Webster
 Bert Jansch
 Beth Nielsen Chapman
 Betty Boo (Rhythm King/Sire/Reprise) (US/Canada)
 Big Country (Giant/Reprise) (US/Canada)
 Big Daddy Kane (Cold Chillin'/Reprise)
 Big Head Todd and the Monsters (Giant/Reprise)
 Bigod 20 (Sire/Reprise)
 Bill Miller
 Billy Corgan
 Billy Hill (Reprise Nashville)
 Bing Crosby
 Black Sabbath (US/Canada)
 Blake Shelton (Reprise Nashville)
 Bloodsimple (Bullygoat/Reprise)
 Bob Mosley
 BoDeans (Slash/Reprise)
 Bone Thugs-N-Harmony
 Bone Thugs-N-Harmony (Asylum/Reprise)
 Bonnie McKee
 Book of Love
 Boredoms
 Brady Seals
 Brian Wilson (Sire/Reprise)
 Browning Bryant
 Bryan Ferry (US/Canada)
 BT (Perfecto/Kinetic/Reprise)
 Buddy Ebsen
 Buddy Greco
 Bulletboys

C
 Caleb Kane
 Captain Beefheart
 Carlene Carter (Giant/Reprise Nashville)
 Cavo
 Chaka Khan
 Charice Pempengco
 Charice
 Charles Aznavour
 Charlie Daniels
 Cher (US/Australia)
 Chicago (Full Moon/Reprise)
 Chris Cummings
 Chris Isaak
 Claudia Church
 Coldcut (Tommy Boy/Reprise)
 Color Me Badd (Giant/Reprise)
 Count Basie
 Craig David (US)
 Crime Mob (Crunk Incorporated/Reprise)

D
 Da Bush Babees
 Daddy Cool
 Dario G (Kinetic/Reprise)
 Dave Gahan (Mute/Reprise) (US/Canada/Mexico)
 David Lee Roth
 David Sanborn
 Dean Martin
 Deborah Harry (Sire/Reprise)
 Debbie Reynolds
 Deftones
 Del Reeves
 Dennis Robbins
 Denny Laine (US/Canada)
 Depeche Mode (Mute/Sire/Reprise) (US/Canada/Mexico)
 Devendra Banhart
 Dinah Shore
 Dino, Desi & Billy
 Dio (US/Canada)
 Disturbed
 Divine Styler (Giant/Reprise)
 Don Ho & the Allies
 Donald Fagen
 Donna Loren
 Drill Team
 Duane Eddy
 Duke Ellington
 Dwight Yoakam (Reprise Nashville)

E
 Ed Sanders
 Eddi Reader
 Eisley
 Ella Fitzgerald
 Emmylou Harris (Reprise Nashville)
 Enya
 Enya (US)
 Erasure (Mute/Sire/Reprise) (US/Canada/Mexico)
 Eric Benét (Friday/Reprise)
 Eric Clapton (Duck/Reprise)
 Esquivel!
 Essra Mohawk
 Esthero
 Ethel Merman

F
 Faith No More (Slash/Reprise)
 Family
 Family of the Year
 Fanny
 Fats Domino
 Filter
 Fleetwood Mac
 Flo & Eddie
 Force MDs (Tommy Boy/Reprise)
 Françoise Hardy (US and Canada, leased from Vogue)
 Frank Sinatra
 Frank Zappa
 Frank Zappa (Bizarre/Reprise)
 Frankie Ballard (Reprise Nashville)

G
 Gerard Way
 Gloriana (Emblem/Reprise Nashville)
 Goldie Hawn
 Gordon Jenkins
 Gordon Lightfoot
 Grace (Perfecto/Kinetic/Reprise)
 Gram Parsons
 Grand Daddy I.U. (Cold Chillin'/Reprise)
 Green Day
 Greg Behrendt
 Groove Collective
 Guster
 The Genius  (Cold Chillin'/Reprise)

H
 The Harold Betters Sound
 Heart
 HIM
 Hindu Love Gods (Giant/Reprise)
 Hiroshima (Qwest/Reprise)
 Hobo Johnson
 Houndmouth
 Hybrid (Kinetic/Reprise)

I
 i5 (Giant/Reprise)
 Ice (In Bloom/Reprise)
 Idina Menzel
 Idiot Pilot
 Information Society (Tommy Boy/Reprise)
 Ivan Lins
 Iyaz

J
 J Mascis
 Jacques Brel
 Jade (Giant/Reprise)
 James Iha
 Jane Siberry (outside Canada)
 Jay Rock
 Jeff Lynne
 Jeremy Jordan (Giant/Reprise)
 Jeremy Spencer
 Jessi Malay
 Jethro Tull (US/Canada)
 Jim Lauderdale
 Jimi Hendrix (US/Canada)
 Jimmy Howes
 Jo Stafford
 Joe E. Lewis
 John Cale
 John Fahey
 John Renbourn
 John Sebastian
 Joni Mitchell
 Josephine Collective
 Josh Groban (143/Reprise)
 Josiah Leming
 Joy Division (Qwest/Reprise) (US/Canada)
 Jude Cole
 Juliet Roberts
 Justin Warfield (Qwest/Reprise)

K
 Kara's Flowers
 Keely Smith
 Keiko Masuda (Japan)
 Kenny Rogers and The First Edition
 Kenny Rogers (Giant/Reprise Nashville)
 Kenny Wayne Shepherd
 Kevin Welch
 Kidsongs
 Kristin Hersh (Sire/Reprise)

L
 L7 (Slash/Reprise)
 India
 Lalaine
 Lenny Bruce
 Lil Scrappy (BME/Reprise)
 Linda Lewis
 Lindsey Buckingham
 Lisahall
 Little Richard
 Lord Finesse (Giant/Reprise)
 Lou Monte
 Lou Reed
 Lovecraft
 Luka Bloom

M
 Mad Lion
 Mandy Moore
 Marc Almond (Sire/Reprise) (US/Canada)
 Maria Muldaur
 Martin L. Gore (Mute/Reprise) (US/Canada/Mexico)
 Mary Wells
 Master Ace (Cold Chillin'/Reprise)
 Mastodon
 Mavis Rivers
 MC Hammer (Giant/Reprise)
 Me'shell Ndegéocello (Maverick/Reprise)
 Men, Women & Children
 Michael Bublé (143/Reprise)
 Michael Franks
 Michael McDonald
 Michael Peterson (Reprise Nashville)
 Michael White
 Michelle Branch
 Mike Oldfield (US)
 Millionaire (PIAS/Reprise)
 Miriam Makeba (US/Canada)
 Mis-Teeq
 Molly & the Heymakers
 Morcheeba
 Morgana King
 Morrissey (Sire/Reprise) (US/Canada)
 Mort Sahl
 Mudcrutch
 Mudhoney
 Music Instructor (Kinetic/Reprise)
 My Chemical Romance

N
 Nancy Sinatra
 Narada Michael Walden
 Neil Young
 Nelson Riddle
 Neon Hitch
 Never Shout Never (Sire/Reprise)
 Nick Cave (North America)
 Nick Heyward
 Nico
 Noel Harrison
 Norman Greenbaum
 Nu Flavor
 Nubian M.O.B. (Cold Chillin'/Reprise)

O
 Oasis (Big Brother/Reprise) (US/Canada)
 Orgy (Elementree/Reprise)

P
 Paris Sisters
 Paul Brandt (Reprise Nashville)
 Paul Westerberg (Sire/Reprise)
 Pearls Before Swine
 The Pentangle
 Peter Green
 Powermad
 Primal Scream
 Pvris

Q
 QDIII (Qwest/Reprise)

R
 Ramblin' Jack Elliott
 Randy Newman
 Randy Scruggs
 Recoil (US/Canada)
 Regurgitator
 Renee Olstead
 Repercussions
 Revolting Cocks (Sire/Reprise)
 Rhino Bucket
 Ric Ocasek
 Richard Pryor
 Rick James
 Ricki Lee Jones
 Ride (Sire/Reprise) (outside UK/Ireland)
 Rob Dougan
 Rob Dougan (US/Canada)
 Roger Troutman
 Rosemary Clooney
 Rosie Flores (Reprise Nashville)
 Roxanne Shanté (Cold Chillin'/Reprise)
 Roxy Music (US/Canada)
 Rüfüs Du Sol
 Rumiko Koyanagi
 Ry Cooder

S
 S. David Cohen
 Saafir (Qwest/Reprise)
 Sammy Davis Jr.
 Sandie Shaw
 Santana
 Sasha Alexander
 Seal
 Serj Tankian
 Shawn Camp
 Shootyz Groove (Kinetic/Reprise)
 Shorty Rogers
 Single File
 Sixpence None the Richer (Squint/Reprise)
 Snake River Conspiracy
 Sonny & Cher
 Sopwith Camel
 Soupy Sales
 Static-X
 Steely Dan (Giant/Reprise)
 Stevie Nicks
 Stills-Young Band
 Streetwalkers
 Stress
 Submarine (Kinetic/Reprise)
 Sweetwater

T
 T. Rex (US/Canada)
 Taja Sevelle (Paisley Park/Reprise)
 Tanita Tikaram
 Tarnation
 Tegan and Sara (Vapor/Reprise)
 Texas Tornados (Reprise Nashville)
 The B-52s
 The Beach Boys (Brother/Reprise)
 The Cult (Sire/Reprise)
 The Del Fuegos (Slash/Reprise)
 The Dream Academy
 The Electric Prunes
 The Farm (Sire/Reprise)
 The First Edition
 The Foremen
 The Fugs
 GrooveGrass
 The GTOs
 The Guess Who
 The Hi-Lo's
 The Hives (Burning Heart/Sire/Reprise)
 The Incredible String Band
 The Jesus and Mary Chain (Blanco y Negro/Reprise) (US)
 The Jimi Hendrix Experience
 The Kinks (US)
 The LeeVees
 The Lynns
 The McGuire Sisters
 The Meters
 The Muffs
 The Network
 The Ocean Blue
 The Other Two (Qwest/Reprise) (US/Canada)
 The Paris Sisters
 The Ready Set (Decaydance/Sire/Reprise)
 The Rentals (Maverick/Reprise)
 The Replacements (Sire/Reprise)
 The Secret Machines
 The Smashing Pumpkins (Martha's Music/Reprise)
 The Smiths (Sire/Reprise) (US/Canada)
 The Spike Drivers
 The Spill Canvas
 The Time (Paisley Park/Reprise)
 The Used
 The Vogues
 The West Coast Pop Art Experimental Band
 The Wild Feathers
 The Wild Swans (Sire/Reprise)
 Theo Bikel
 Tia Carrere
 Tiffany Affair
 Times Two
 Tiny Tim
 Harlow
 Tom Lehrer
 Tom Paxton
 Tom Petty & The Heartbreakers
 Tom Tom Club (Sire/Reprise)
 Tony Banks (Giant/Reprise) (US/Canada)
 Tracy Nelson
 Trini Lopez
 Twin Shadow

V
 V Factory
 V.I.C. (Young Mogul/Reprise)
 Victoria Shaw
 Violent Femmes (Slash/Reprise)
 Vonda Shepard

W
 Walter Becker
 Warren Zevon (Giant/Reprise)
 Waterlillies (Sire/Reprise)
 Wilco
 Wild Man Fischer
 Wynona Carr

Y
 Yaz (US/Canada)
 YGz

Z
 Zapp
 Zwan (Martha's Music/Reprise)

See also
 Reprise Records

Reprise Records